George Hodges (30 May 1851 – 30 August 1921) was an Anglican priest, Archdeacon of Sudbury from 1902 to 1920.

The son of another George Hodges, sometime Vicar of St Andrew, Hastings, he was educated at St John's School, Leatherhead, St John's College, Cambridge and ordained in 1878. He was Curate at Milton-next-Sittingbourne then Stoke-by-Nayland. He was the vicar of St James's, Bury St Edmunds from 1888 to 1912; and Rural Dean of Thingoes from 1888 to 1902. He was a Canon Residentiary at Ely cathedral from 1912.

References

1851 births
1921 deaths
19th-century English Anglican priests
20th-century English Anglican priests
Alumni of St John's College, Cambridge
Archdeacons of Sudbury
People educated at St John's School, Leatherhead